Johnny Mathis Sings is an album by American pop singer Johnny Mathis that was released by Mercury Records on March 10, 1967 and was the last of his 11 studio projects for the label. Eight of the twelve tracks were recorded since the completion of his previous LP, So Nice, while four of the tracks were leftovers from the recording sessions for previous Mercury albums. The finished product included a number from Broadway's The Roar of the Greasepaint—the Smell of the Crowd, a  cover of the Beatles hit "Eleanor Rigby", two offerings from songwriters Burt Bacharach and Hal David, and three cuts that originated in film scores but had lyrics added later: the melody for "Strangers in the Night" was written for A Man Could Get Killed; "Somewhere My Love" began as "Lara's Theme" from Doctor Zhivago; and "Lovers in New York" started out as the instrumental title track from Breakfast at Tiffany's.

This final Mercury LP made its first appearance on Billboard magazine's Top LP's chart in the issue dated April 1 of that year and reached number 103 during its 11 weeks there.

Johnny Mathis Sings  was released for the first time on compact disc on December 4, 2012, as one of two albums on one CD, the second of the two being So Nice. Both were also included in Sony's Mathis box set The Complete Global Albums Collection, which was released on November 17, 2014.

History

The song on this album that stood out for Mathis upon recollection was "Lovers in New York". "The minute I heard it in Breakfast at Tiffany's – and it was just that one scene when they were walking down the street in New York – I just loved it. And I said, I hope…there’s just got to be words to that, and it turns out there were. They were written by Jay Livingston and Ray Evans, who were wonderful writers…and nice men."

The point of interest here that Mathis addressed most candidly, however, was the fact that he was saying farewell to Mercury with this album. He summarized the time spent with the label in relation to the rest of his recording career in 2012. "'The only time I was not secure in what I was doing was during the three years I was with Mercury.'" The years of mentoring he enjoyed as a new recording artist at Columbia ended rather abruptly when he arrived there. "'I needed someone to listen and suggest alternatives as far as my note selections were concerned…a producer who listens to you and says, "I like what you’re doing, but I hate that last note you made. Don't do that…do this." It just didn't work as well as it did at Columbia.'" The time at Mercury may have been frustrating, but it did begin a new path in terms of song selection. "'I'd listen to the stuff [recorded at Mercury] and wish I had a chance to do it again.  But it was beneficial in many ways because I was eventually able to sing music that was the direction that I went to when I went back to Columbia…wonderful songs that were not necessarily big hits but ones that suited me intellectually as well as vocally.'"

Reception

Joe Viglione of Allmusic wrote that "these dozen tunes are grade A and sequenced very nicely." He also noted that the "vocal on "I Wish You Love" is extraordinary Mathis," and that he was especially fond of " a marvelous study of Bobby Hebb's "Sunny", a slow tempo rendition songwriter Hebb has stated he is most proud of".

Track listing

Side one
"Saturday Sunshine" (Burt Bacharach, Hal David) – 2:36
"Lovers in New York" (Jay Livingston, Ray Evans, Henry Mancini) – 3:03
"Eleanor Rigby" (John Lennon, Paul McCartney) – 2:55
"Sunny" (Bobby Hebb) – 4:19
"Who Can I Turn To?" from The Roar of the Greasepaint—the Smell of the Crowd (Leslie Bricusse, Anthony Newley) – 2:40
"Strangers in the Night" (Bert Kaempfert, Charles Singleton, Eddie Snyder) – 3:30

Side two
"(There's) Always Something There to Remind Me" (Bacharach, David) – 2:42
"Somewhere My Love" (Maurice Jarre, Paul Francis Webster) – 3:30
"Who Can Say" (Norman Gimbel, Riz Ortolani) – 2:50
"I Wish You Love" (Albert Beach, Charles Trenet) – 4:22
"The Second Time Around" from High Time (Sammy Cahn, Jimmy Van Heusen) – 3:13
"Wake the Town and Tell the People" (Jerry Livingston, Sammy Gallop) – 2:50

Recording dates
From the liner notes for The Complete Global Albums Collection:

November 4, 1963: "Wake the Town and Tell the People"
August 27, 1965: "Lovers in New York"
June 23, 1966: "I Wish You Love", "The Second Time Around"
September 15, 1966: "Who Can Say"
October 28, 1966: "Saturday Sunshine", "(There's) Always Something There to Remind Me", "Who Can I Turn To?"
October 31, 1966: "Eleanor Rigby", "Somewhere My Love", "Strangers in the Night", "Sunny"

Personnel

Johnny Mathis – vocals; producer
Wallace Seawell – cover photos
Lorser Feitelson (Ankrum Gallery, Los Angeles) – front cover painting

When "Lovers in New York" was included on the 1997 Mathis compilation The Global Masters, the liner notes indicated that the song was from a different Mancini project, the television series Peter Gunn.

Mathis is credited as producer of this album in the liner notes of The Complete Global Albums Collection, but no credits for arrangers or conductors were provided there or on the original album jacket or in the liner notes for the album's CD debut.

References

Bibliography

1967 albums
Johnny Mathis albums
Mercury Records albums
Albums produced by Johnny Mathis